Piedimonte San Germano (locally Prmont) is a comune (municipality) in the province of Frosinone in the Italian region of Lazio, located in the Liri River valley about  southeast of Rome and about  southeast of Frosinone.

It is home to the Fiat Cassino Plant production plant.

References

External links
 Official website

Cities and towns in Lazio